Live! is the second live recording from the band Kasabian. It was recorded at the O2 Arena in London on 15 December 2011. It was released in CD, DVD and Blu-ray Disc formats.

The audio CD was recorded on 14 and 15 December 2011 and first released as a limited edition exclusively by Concert Live in February 2012 before being reissued by Sony in May 2012.

Track listing

CD: Live!

DVD: Live at the O2

Personnel 

 Tom Meighan – lead vocals
 Sergio Pizzorno – vocals, electric and acoustic guitars, keyboards
 Chris Edwards – bass
 Ian Matthews – drums, percussion
 Jay Mehler – lead guitar
 Ben Kealey – keyboards
 Gary Alesbrook – trumpet

References

External links
Official site

Kasabian albums
2012 live albums
Eagle Records live albums